Camarades was French autonomist magazine published in Paris in the 1970s. It was published by a group of the same name which played a major role in the development of the autonomist movement in France. Their politics were often characterised as that of " “organised autonomy”.

First series
There were four issues of the first series:
 N° 1 (April-May 1974)
 N° 2-3 (April-May 1975)
 N° 4 (December 1975)

New series
A second series, called "nouvelle série" then appeared:
 N° 1 (April-May 1976)
 N° 2 (Summer 1976): Issue includes Chomage made in the USA by Paolo Carpignano.
 N° 3 (December 1976)
 N° 4-5 (June 1977)
supplement to N° 4 : Autonomie et autodéfense (May 1977) 4 pp.
 N° 6 (November 1977)
 N° 7-8 (Spring-Summer 1978)
supplement to N° 7-8 : Dossier travail précaire 14pp.

References

Autonomism